The Oklahoma Wing of the Civil Air Patrol (CAP) is the highest echelon of Civil Air Patrol in the state of Oklahoma. Oklahoma Wing headquarters are located at Tinker Air Force Base near Oklahoma City. The Oklahoma Wing consists of over 650 cadet and adult members at over 16 locations across the state of Oklahoma.

Mission
The Oklahoma Wing performs the three missions of Civil Air Patrol: providing emergency services; offering cadet programs for youth; and providing aerospace education for both CAP members and the general public.

Emergency services
Civil Air Patrol provides emergency services, which includes performing search and rescue and disaster relief missions; as well as assisting in humanitarian aid assignments. CAP also provides Air Force support through conducting light transport, communications support, and low-altitude route surveys. Civil Air Patrol can also offer support to counter-drug missions.

In May 2013, the Oklahoma Wing undertook its first ever large scale, ground-based photo reconnaissance mission for FEMA following the Moore, Oklahoma tornado. Over 15,000 high resolution photographs were provided to FEMA to aid in the agency's damage assessment efforts.

Cadet programs
Civil Air Patrol offers a cadet program for youth aged 12 to 21, which includes aerospace education, leadership training, physical fitness and moral leadership.

Aerospace education
Civil Air Patrol offers aerospace education for CAP members and the general public, including providing training to the members of CAP, and offering workshops for youth throughout the nation through schools and public aviation events.

Organization

See also
Oklahoma Air National Guard
Oklahoma State Guard

References

External links
Oklahoma Wing Civil Air Patrol official website

Wings of the Civil Air Patrol
Education in Oklahoma
Military in Oklahoma